Judy Fudge is a scholar of labour law and the LIUNA Enrico Henry Mancinelli Professor in Global Labour Issues at McMaster University. Before coming to McMaster, Fudge was a professor of law at the University of Kent and the Landsdowne Chair in Law at the University of Victoria Faculty of Law. In 2019, she received the Bora Laskin Award from the University of Toronto in recognition of her work on labour law.

Publications

References

External links 
 Profile at McMaster University
 

Labour law scholars
Academics of the University of Kent
Academic staff of the University of Victoria
Academic staff of McMaster University
Year of birth missing (living people)
Living people